Mexicana Universal Jalisco is a pageant in Jalisco, Mexico,  that selects that state's representative for the national Mexicana Universal pageant. Jalisco is considered one of the strongest states in Mexican pageantry, as they are almost always among the finalists.

Jalisco is the first state that has produced more winners of Nuestra Belleza México/Mexicana Universal in history. With  5 Nuestra Belleza México crowns (now Mexicana Universal), 3 of them being consecutive years 2008, 2009, 2010. The state organization has also produced one Nuestra Belleza Mundo México in 1996 and the second Miss Universe winner in Mexican history Ximena Navarrete in 2010.

Jalisco is the state was the first to place two representatives in the top 5 (2008, 2010, 2014). Jalisco was placed for the eleventh consecutive year in the top 5 since 2004.

Titleholders
Below are the names of the annual titleholders of Nuestra Belleza Jalisco 1994-2017, Mexicana Universal Jalisco 2018, and their final placements in the Mexicana Universal.

 Competed in Miss Universe.
 Competed in Miss International.
 Competed in Miss Charm International.
 Competed in Miss Continente Americano.
 Competed in Reina Hispanoamericana.
 Competed in Miss Orb International.
 Competed in Nuestra Latinoamericana Universal.

1 In 1996, a pre-pageant to choose the delegate to Miss World was held the day prior to the final Nuestra Belleza México competition. Yessica Salazar of Jalisco resulted as the winner. She eventually placed among the Top 16 during the final.

Designated contestants
As of 2000, it is not uncommon for some states to have more than one delegate competing simultaneously in the national pageant. The following Nuestra Belleza Jalisco contestants were invited to compete in Nuestra Belleza México. Some have placed higher than the actual state winners, but have yet to win.

Contestants notes
Esmeralda Pimentel later studied acting in Televisa's CEA and eventually made her debut in Verano de Amor (2009), playing the role of Ada Claveria.
Gladys Castellanos was 1st Runner-up in Nuestra Belleza México 2006 and she was chosen to represent Mexico in Miss Continente Americano 2007 where she won the 3rd place.
Karin Ontiveros is Nuestra Belleza México 2010 and she will represent Mexico in Miss Universe 2011, in hopes of becoming the third Miss Universe from Mexico, and the second consecutively.
Karla Carrillo was Nuestra Belleza México 2008 and represented Mexico in the international Miss Universe 2009, on August 23 of that year. On September 18, 2010 representedMexico in Miss Continente Americano 2010 and placed as the 1st Runner-up.
Jacqueline Bracamontes was Nuestra Belleza México 2000 and represented her country in Miss Universe 2001 on May 11, 2001, where she didn't place. After being crowned Nuestra Belleza México in 2000, she decided to pursue a television career.
Lupita González was 1st Runmer-up in Nuestra Belleza México 2007 and she was chosen to represent Mexico in Miss Continente Americano 2008 where she won the title, becoming Mexico's first representative to win that title. Also she won the awards as Miss Photogenic and Miss Yanbal Face.
Luz Elena González was 2nd Runner-up in Nuestra Belleza México 1994, studied at the CEA. Her first outing as an actress in the telenovela "Preciosa" and then "El Niño que Vino del Mar", "Por un Beso", "Entre el Amor y el Odio" and "Alegrijes y Rebujos". After she participated in the Reality Show Big Brother VIP 3. Her most recent work was in '"Hasta que el Dinero nos Separe", in the role of Vicky. She's a singer.
Ximena Navarrete was Nuestra Belleza México 2009 and she was crowned Miss Universe 2010 on August 23, 2010, making her the second Mexican delegate to win the title, after Lupita Jones in 1991. Both were crowned in Las Vegas, Nevada, USA.
Yessica Salazar was Nuestra Belleza Mundo México 1996 and participated in Miss World 1996, she placing among the semi-finalists and placed 6th overall on November 22, 1996 . During the pageant, Yessica was also awarded the title of Miss Spectacular Beach Wear, today is a Mexican actress.

External links

Articles about the event 

Nuestra Belleza México
Jalisco